The 2008 Rally d'Italia Sardegna is the sixth round of 2008 World Rally Championship season. The event began on May 16 in Olbia, Italy, and finished on May 18.

Results

Special stages 
All dates and times are CEST (UTC+2).

External links 
 Results at official page WRC.com

Sardegna
Rally Italia Sardegna
Sardegna